Ralf Jaros (born 13 December 1965, in Düsseldorf) is a former German triple jumper. With a height of 1.93 m (6 ft 4 in), he had a competition weight of 85 kg (187 lb).

On 30 June 1991, in the European Cup, Ralf Jaros set a German triple jump record of 17.66 meters (57 ft 11 in) while defeating the nearest competitor by nearly 72 cm (28 in). This remains the current national record in the event.

At the age of 18, Ralf Jaros made his international debut in the 1984 Olympic Games. He finished in the seventeenth position in the qualification round. In the 1985 season, he finished fourth in the European Indoor Championships with a distance of 16.78 meters (55 ft 1 in), and sixth in the World Indoor Games with a distance of 16.61 meters (54 ft 6 in).  Knee injuries prevented Jaros from taking part in international competition for some years following these events.

He finished ninth in the 1991 World Championships. In the 1992 Olympic Games, he narrowly failed to qualify for the final round, ranking thirteenth in qualification. He finished fourth in the 1993 World Championships with a distance of 17.34 meters (56 ft 11 in).

Jaros was German outdoor champion in the triple jump in 1984 and 1985 as well as 1990 to 1993. He was German indoor champion in the event in 1984, 1985 and 1994. He represented the clubs DJK Agon Düsseldorf and TV Wattenscheid.

International competitions

References

1965 births
Living people
Sportspeople from Düsseldorf
German male triple jumpers
West German male triple jumpers
Olympic athletes of West Germany
Olympic athletes of Germany
Athletes (track and field) at the 1984 Summer Olympics
Athletes (track and field) at the 1992 Summer Olympics
World Athletics Championships athletes for Germany
DJK Agon 08 Düsseldorf athletes
TV Wattenscheid athletes